No Matter What They Say is a song by Lil' Kim

No Matter What They Say	may also refer to:
"No Matter What They Say", song by Denise LaSalle	1978
"No Matter What They Say", song by Priscilla Hernández  
"No Matter What They Say", song by Heinz (singer)	Meek, Lawrence 1964
"No Matter What They Say", song by Booker T. & the MG's, sampled in "Shamrocks and Shenanigans" on House of Pain (album)
"No Matter What They Say", song by Raptile